Anne of Green Gables: The Sequel, also known as Anne of Avonlea or Anne of Avonlea: The Continuing Story of Anne of Green Gables, is a 1987 Canadian television miniseries film and the second in a series of four films. A sequel to the 1985 miniseries Anne of Green Gables, it is based on Lucy Maud Montgomery's novels Anne of Avonlea, Anne of the Island, and Anne of Windy Poplars.

The Disney Channel was the first television station to broadcast the miniseries in four hour-long installments, giving the world premiere of the series in May and June 1987, using the title Anne of Avonlea: The Continuing Story of Anne of Green Gables. This was the same title used in March 1988 when the series was broadcast on the PBS anthology series WonderWorks. Disney later shortened the title in television syndication and for VHS and DVD sales to simply Anne of Avonlea.  The airing rights and video rights to the program in the United States were initially purchased by PBS under the title Anne of Avonlea, and the rights to broadcast the series and sell the series for home video under that title were purchased by the Walt Disney Company from PBS in 1987.

The series debuted in Canada using the title Anne of Green Gables: The Sequel in two 150-minute installments, in December 1987, on CBC (Canadian Broadcasting Corporation). The miniseries has used various names in international markets, depending on the distribution rights in that given market with Disney using the title Anne of Avonlea and Sullivan Films of Toronto using the title Anne of Green Gables: The Sequel in European and Asian markets.

Plot
After two years of teaching at the Avonlea school, Anne Shirley dreams of being a writer, but her story "Averil's Atonement" is rejected by a magazine. Her best friend Diana Barry has become engaged. Marilla's eyesight has also improved, opening an opportunity for Anne to follow her ambitions, which have been on hold since giving up the Avery Scholarship.

Anne's misadventures in Avonlea continue. Unbeknownst to her, Diana submitted "Averil's Atonement" into a contest to introduce the new Rollings Reliable baking powder to the public, and it wins first prize. Anne is grateful to her friend for trying to boost her spirits, but finds the widespread recognition humiliating. She later sees her jersey cow Dolly in Rachel Lynde's field, which she had promised would never happen again. After unsuccessfully trying to get Dolly back to her field, Anne sells the cow to Gilbert Blythe and his father. She laments about her "Jonah day" to Marilla, who offers encouragement and plum puffs, only to discover she actually sold Rachel's cow instead of her own. When she and Marilla pay a visit to the Lyndes to explain her mistake, Rachel's ailing husband Thomas passes away, which Rachel fears will force her to sell her farm and leave Avonlea.

At a clambake for Diana's engagement, Gilbert proposes to Anne, but she rejects his offer, convinced that their marriage would be unhappy and unsuccessful. She later runs into Morgan Harris, a traveling businessman whom she had previously met at the beach and who shows interest in her. At Diana's wedding, she sees Gilbert with a young woman named Christine Stuart. Gilbert insists they are just friends, and offers to wait for Anne, but she affirms she will never marry. Back at Green Gables, Marilla reveals that Rachel will be moving in with her. Anne decides to accept a job offer from her former teacher Miss Stacey as an English literature teacher at Kingsport Ladies' College in New Brunswick.

Anne initially finds her job difficult. Kingsport is dominated by the wealthy and conceited Pringle family, who resent that she received the position over one of their own. The students in her class, led by Jen Pringle, delight in causing trouble to make Anne look like a bad teacher. Anne must also endure the cold and sarcastic principal of Kingsport Ladies' College, Katherine Brooke. She grows close to Emmeline Harris, a motherless student who also happens to be Morgan's daughter. After Anne and Emmeline get on Katherine Brooke's bad side, Morgan withdraws both his daughter and his financial support from K.L.C. He sends Emmeline to live with her stern grandmother Margaret Harris and repressed aunt Pauline at their mansion, Maplehurst. Anne convinces Mrs. Harris to let her tutor Emmeline at home, and let Pauline attend a friend's wedding anniversary overnight. Meanwhile, Anne and Miss Stacey organize a play to raise money for the school, with Jen Pringle playing the lead role of Mary, Queen of Scots. When Jen calls off sick on the day of the show, Anne convinces Morgan to let Emmeline star in the play, which they have been rehearsing during tutoring sessions. The show is a success and Anne finally wins the Pringles' support. After returning from a trip to Boston, she runs into Gilbert and finds out that he is engaged to Christine Stuart. Inspired by his suggestion, she publishes a series of short stories entitled Avonlea Vignettes. During a hospital benefit ball, Morgan asks her to marry him, which she declines.

After Mrs. Harris dies, Pauline accepts a marriage proposal and Morgan decides to sell Maplehurst and return to Boston with Emmeline. Anne resigns from K.L.C. and persuades Katherine to come back to Avonlea with her for the summer holidays. Upon arriving at Green Gables and meeting Diana's new baby, Anne discovers that Gilbert has fallen ill with scarlet fever, which he contracted at medical school in Halifax. Finally realizing her true feelings for Gilbert, Anne rushes to his bedside, where he tells her that he has called off his engagement to Christine because Anne is the only one for him. After recovering, he proposes once more, and Anne accepts him with a kiss.

Timeline of events (1902–1903)
Late spring 1902 – Anne, now 18, finishes teaching at Avonlea school.
Summer 1902 – Diana marries Fred, Anne takes  a teaching position at Kingsport Ladies College.
September 1902 – Anne begins teaching at Kingsport Ladies College.
November 26, 1902 – Production date of Anne's play at Kingsport Ladies College.
Summer 1903 – Katherine Brooke spends summer break with Anne at Green Gables. Anne commits to Gilbert.

Cast

Megan Follows - Anne Shirley
Colleen Dewhurst - Marilla Cuthbert
Jonathan Crombie - Gilbert Blythe
Richard Farnsworth - Matthew Cuthbert
Schuyler Grant - Diana Barry
Patricia Hamilton - Rachel Lynde
Marilyn Lightstone - Miss Stacey
Wendy Hiller - Mrs. Margaret Harris
Frank Converse - Morgan Harris
Kate Lynch - Pauline Harris
Genevieve Appleton - Emmeline Harris
Rosemary Dunsmore - Katherine Brooke
Susannah Hoffman - Jen Pringle
Nuala Fitzgerald - Mrs. Tom Pringle
Molly MacNeil - Myra Pringle
Fiona McGillivray - Hattie Pringle
London Juno - Jimsie Pringle
Bruce McCulloch - Fred Wright
Sheila Harcourt - Christine Stuart
Kathryn Trainor - Essie
Rosemary Radcliffe - Mrs. Barry
Charmion King - Aunt Josephine Barry
Robert Collins - Mr. Barry
Kay Hawtrey - Mabel Sloane
Jacqueline Blais - Mrs. Harrison
Anna Ferguson - Mrs. Boulter
Trish Nettleton - Jane Andrews
Jennifer Inch - Ruby Gillis
Brigit Wilson - Tillie Boulter
Miranda de Pencier - Josie Pye (uncredited)
Ian Heath - Anthony Pye
Mag Ruffman - Alice Lawson
Dave Foley - Lewis Allen

Awards and nominations
2 Cable Ace Awards: Best Costume, Best Supporting Actress (Colleen Dewhurst), 1987
6 Gemini Awards: Best Dramatic Miniseries, Best Photography (Marc Champion), Best Art Direction, Best Costume Design, Best Performance by Lead Actress (Megan Follows), Best Performance by a Supporting Actress (Colleen Dewhurst), 1988
Silver Award - International Film and Television Festival, New York, 1987
Best Family Series - TV Guide, 1987
CFTA Award - Best New TV Production, 1987
Chris Award - Columbus International Film Festival, 1987
Honourable Mention - International San Francisco Film Festival, 1988
Crystal Apple Award - National Education Film and Video Festival, 1988
ACT Award - Achievement in Children's TV, 1988
Golden Hugo Award - Chicago International Film Festival, 1987
Gold Award - Houston International Film Festival, 1987

Sequels and spinoffs 
Road to Avonlea is a television series which was first broadcast in Canada and the United States between 1990 and 1996. It was inspired by a series of short stories and two novels by Lucy Maud Montgomery.  Many of the actors in the Anne of Green Gables movies also appear in storylines crossing over into the long-running Emmy award-winning series, including Patricia Hamilton as Rachel Lynde, Colleen Dewhurst as Marilla Cuthbert until her death in 1991, and Marilyn Lightstone as Muriel Stacy. Jonathan Crombie returned as Gilbert Blythe in a one-time guest appearance in the finale episode of season three, which dealt with Marilla's death. Other actors from the first two Anne films portrayed different characters in Road to Avonlea, including Rosemary Dunsmore, who played Katherine Brooke in this film but returned as "Abigail MacEwan" in the television series.

Anne of Green Gables: The Continuing Story was released in 2000. Many cast members from the first two movies returned, including Megan Follows, Jonathan Crombie, and Schuyler Grant. Taking place in the midst of World War I, the movie follows Anne (now in her twenties) as she embarks on a new journey, taking her from her home in Prince Edward Island to New York City, London, and into war-ravaged Europe.  This film is an original story not based on any of Montgomery's novels, nor does it align with the chronology of the books. Montgomery's Rilla of Ingleside, which also takes place during the first World War, focuses on Anne's teenage daughter and depicts Anne and Gilbert as a middle-aged couple who witness the effects of the war from the home front while their adult sons fight in Europe.

Anne of Green Gables: A New Beginning was released in fall 2008 (the 100th anniversary of the original novel), serving as both a sequel and prequel to the previous films, and is not based on the books. Set near the end of World War II in 1945, the story follows a middle-aged Anne (Barbara Hershey) looking back on her life before arriving at Green Gables. Hannah Endicott-Douglas played the role of young Anne.

Production
When Kevin Sullivan was commissioned by CBC, PBS and The Disney Channel to create a sequel he started by combining many different elements of Montgomery's first three sequel books: Anne of Avonlea (1909), Anne of the Island (1915), and Anne of Windy Poplars (1936) into a cohesive screen story. Sullivan invented his own plotline relying on several of Montgomery's episodic storylines spread across the three sequels, He also looked at numerous other nineteenth century female authors for inspiration in fleshing out the screen story.

The film succeeded in re-popularizing Megan Follows and Colleen Dewhurst in their original roles. Sullivan also cast British veteran actress and Oscar winner, Wendy Hiller, in the role of the impossible Mrs. Harris whom Sullivan created based on a composite of several matriarchs found in the series of novels.

In Canada, the film became the highest rated drama to air on network television in Canadian broadcasting history. This Sequel became known as Anne of Green Gables - The Sequel when shown around the world, and as Anne of Avonlea - the Continuing Story of Anne of Green Gables  when it premiered on The Disney Channel.

ACE Award nomination
Megan Follows was nominated for an ACE Award in 1988 by the National Academy of Cable Programing in the Ninth Annual System Awards for Cable Excellence for Disney's "Anne of Avonlea".

Home Box Office led with 112 nominations for the ACE Award, or Award for Cable Excellence. Showtime was awarded 48, Arts & Entertainment 33, and the Disney Channel and Cable News Network 10 each, respectively. 30 categories of the 174 ACE Awards were presented on a live broadcast on HBO on January 24, 1988. The other categories were presented at a non-televised dinner in Las Vegas, on January 22, 1988. The ACE awards were established after cable programs and performers were excluded from the Emmy Awards. The National Academy of Cable Programming was established in March 1985 to promote excellence in cable television programming.

References

External links
The Official Anne of Green Gables Movie Website - The official website of Sullivan series of Anne of Green Gables movies
Sullivan Entertainment Website - The Official website of Sullivan Entertainment. Includes information on the Anne movies and its spinoffs
Road to Avonlea Website - The official website for Road to Avonlea, the spinoff to the Green Gables series of movies
 
 L.M. Montgomery Online Formerly the L.M. Montgomery Research Group, this site includes a blog, extensive lists of primary and secondary materials, detailed information about Montgomery's publishing history, and a filmography of screen adaptations of Montgomery texts. See, in particular, the page for Anne of Green Gables: The Sequel.

1980s Canadian television miniseries
1987 films
Anne of Green Gables films
CBC Television original films
Films directed by Kevin Sullivan
Films set in New Brunswick
Gemini and Canadian Screen Award for Best Television Film or Miniseries winners
Canadian drama television films
1980s Canadian films